A mitten is a glove without individual finger openings.

Mitten(s) may also refer to:

Landforms
The Mitten, a mountain in Antarctica
West and East Mitten Buttes, a geologic formation in Monument Valley
Lower Peninsula of Michigan, nicknamed "the Mitten"

Animals
Chinese mitten crab, a species of crab native to Eastern Asia
Mittens (cat), a famous cat from Wellington, New Zealand
Polydactyl cat, also known as "mitten cat"

Arts

Film and television
The Mitten (film), a 1967 Soviet animated film
 Mittens, a character in the 2008 film Bolt
 Mittens, a kitten character in Timmy Time

Literature
 Mittens, a kitten in Beatrix Potter tale The Tale of Tom Kitten
 The Mitten (folk tale), a Ukrainian folk tale adapted to several media

Music
 "Mittens", a song by Carly Rae Jepsen
 Mittens Records, a record label founded by Julie Feeney

Other uses
Yakovlev Yak-130, NATO reporting name
 MitteN Fuchu, Shopping center
 Mittens (chess engine), by Chess.com
Mitt Romney (born 1947), American politician nicknamed "Mittens"

See also
Glove (disambiguation)
Mitte (disambiguation), a German word for middle—Mitten is another grammatical form of Mitte